In the Southwestern United States, Pueblo (capitalized) refers to the Native tribes of Puebloans having fixed-location communities with permanent buildings which also are called pueblos (lowercased). The Spanish explorers of northern New Spain used the term pueblo to refer to permanent indigenous towns they found in the region, mainly in New Mexico and parts of Arizona, in the former province of Nuevo México. This term continued to be used to describe the communities housed in apartment structures built of stone, adobe mud, and other local material. The structures were usually multi-storied buildings surrounding an open plaza, with rooms accessible only through ladders raised/lowered by the inhabitants, thus protecting them from break-ins and unwanted guests. Larger pueblos were occupied by hundreds to thousands of Puebloan people. Various federally recognized tribes have traditionally resided in pueblos of such design. Later Pueblo Deco and modern Pueblo Revival architecture, which mixes elements of traditional Pueblo and Hispano design, has continued to be a popular architectural style in New Mexico. The term is now part of the proper name of some historical sites, such as Acoma Pueblo.

Etymology and usage

One teaching simply refers to "pueblo" as a type of adobe house or dwelling place.

The word pueblo is the Spanish word both for "town" or "village" and for "people". It comes from the Latin root word populus meaning "people". Spanish colonials applied the term to their own civic settlements, but to only those Native American settlements having fixed locations and permanent buildings. Less-permanent native settlements (such as those found in California) were often referred to as rancherías.

Of the federally recognized Native American communities in the Southwest, those designated by the King of Spain as pueblo at the time Spain ceded territory to the United States, after the American Revolutionary War, are legally recognized as Pueblo by the Bureau of Indian Affairs. Some of the pueblos also came under jurisdiction of the United States, in its view, by its treaty with Mexico, which had briefly gained rule over territory in the Southwest ceded by Spain after Mexican independence. There are 21 federally recognized Pueblos that are home to Pueblo peoples. Their official federal names are as follows:

Historical places

Pre-Columbian towns and villages in the Southwest, such as Acoma, were located in defensible positions, for example, on high steep mesas. Anthropologists and official documents often refer to ancient residents of the area as pueblo cultures. For example, the National Park Service states, "The Late Puebloan cultures built the large, integrated villages found by the Spaniards when they began to move into the area."
The people of some pueblos, such as Taos Pueblo, still inhabit centuries-old adobe pueblo buildings.

Contemporary residents often maintain other homes outside the historic pueblos.  Adobe and light construction methods resembling adobe now dominate architecture at the many pueblos of the area, in nearby towns or cities, and in much of the American Southwest.

In addition to contemporary pueblos, numerous ruins of archeological interest are located throughout the Southwest. Some are of relatively recent origin.  Others are of prehistoric origin, such as the cliff dwellings and other habitations of the Ancient Pueblo peoples, who emerged as a people around the 12th century BCE and began to construct their pueblos about AD 750–900.

See also 
All Pueblo Council of Governors
Ancient dwellings of Pueblo peoples
Ancient Pueblo peoples
Cuisine of the Southwestern United States
New Mexican cuisine
New Mexico music
Pueblo Revolt
Pueblo music

References

External links
The SMU-in-Taos Research Publications collection contains nine anthropological and archaeological monographs and edited volumes representing decades of research, primarily on Pueblo Indian sites near Taos, New Mexico, including Papers on Taos archaeology, Taos Archeology, Picuris Pueblo through time: eight centuries of change in a northern Rio Grande pueblo and Excavations at Pot Creek Pueblo.

 
Traditional Native American dwellings